The 2021 UCI Mountain Bike Marathon World Championships took place in Elba, Italy on 2 October 2021. It was the 19th edition of the UCI Mountain Bike Marathon World Championships.

Medal summary

References

External links
Official website

2021 UCI Mountain Bike Marathon World Championships
World Championships
Mountain Bike Marathon World Championships
International sports competitions hosted by Italy
Mountain Bike Marathon World Championships
2021